Russell Edwin Pennell (born November 28, 1960) is an American basketball coach, who was last the head coach for the University of Central Arkansas.

Pennell was born in Pittsburg, Kansas and graduated from Pittsburg High School.  He played college basketball at the University of Arkansas and at the University of Central Arkansas, where he was two-year starter at point guard.  Pennell later received his bachelor's and master's degrees from Pittsburg State University.

Biography

Assistant coach
He has been an assistant coach at Pittsburg State, Oklahoma State, University of Mississippi, and Arizona State. Pennell coached at Arizona State from 1998 to 2004.  He then ran the Arizona Premier AAU summer league program for two seasons. During the 2007–08 season, he was a color analyst for men's basketball on the Arizona State radio network.

Head coach
On May 5, 2008, Arizona head coach Lute Olson announced the hiring of Pennell as an assistant coach.  Pennell became the interim head coach on October 24, when Olson announced his surprise retirement for medical reasons. As interim coach, Pennell has coached the Wildcats to a 19–13 record in the regular season (9–9 conference). Because of Arizona's mid-season success, Pennell had been rumored as a contender for the Pac-10's Coach of the Year. Ultimately, Pennell did not win the award as Arizona slumped at the end of the regular season, but his work as Arizona's coach was enough to get Arizona into the NCAA tournament for the 25th consecutive year. Arizona advanced past the first round, where, as a 12th seed, they upset 5th seed Utah (Arizona's first first round win since 2006) and defeated 13th seed Cleveland State to move on to the Sweet 16 for the first time since 2005. However, Arizona suffered a crushing defeat against overall #1 seed Louisville, losing 103–64. On April 7, Arizona signed Xavier men's basketball coach Sean Miller to a 5-year, $11-million contract, ending Pennell's tenure with the Wildcats.

On April 9, 2009, Pennell was hired as head coach of the men's basketball team at Division II Grand Canyon University, a member of the Pacific West Conference.  On March 15, 2013, he resigned, replaced by Dan Majerle.

On August 8, 2013, the Phoenix Mercury announced the hiring of Pennell as interim head coach following the firing of Corey Gaines. Pennell guided the team to the Western Conference finals. He announced after the season that he would not return as coach in 2014, and that he hoped to return to coaching in the college ranks.

On March 5, 2014, news broke that Pennell was expected to be named the next head coach of men's basketball at Central Arkansas. On January 7, 2020 it was announced that Pennell would step down from his position. This move followed a leave of absence for personal reasons he took in December 2019.

Personal life
Pennell is married and has two children.

Head coaching record

College

WNBA

|- 
| align="left" |Phoenix
| align="left" |2013
|13||9||4||||| 3rd in Western ||5||2||3||||Lost Conference semifinals
|-class="sortbottom"
| align="center" colspan=2|Career
|13||9||4|||| ||5||2||3||||

References

External links
Grand Canyon bio
Arizona bio
Arizona State bio

1960 births
Living people
American men's basketball players
American women's basketball coaches
Arizona State Sun Devils men's basketball coaches
Arizona Wildcats men's basketball coaches
Arkansas Razorbacks men's basketball players
Basketball coaches from Kansas
Basketball players from Kansas
Central Arkansas Bears basketball coaches
Central Arkansas Bears basketball players
College men's basketball head coaches in the United States
Grand Canyon Antelopes men's basketball coaches
People from Pittsburg, Kansas
Phoenix Mercury coaches
Pittsburg State Gorillas men's basketball coaches
Point guards